Cesarzowice may refer to the following villages in Poland:
Cesarzowice in Środa Śląska County, Lower Silesian Voivodeship (SW Poland)
Cesarzowice in Gmina Kąty Wrocławskie, Wrocław County in Lower Silesian Voivodeship (SW Poland)